Kausar, Kautsar, Kauser, Kawthar or Kaouthar is an Arabic Muslim given name for both males or females, which means "abundance", "bountiful" or "plentiful". The name is either a reference to surah Al-Kawthar or Hauzu'l-Kausar, a sacred lake called the "pond of abundance" in Paradise, mentioned in the Quran. The name and its variants are popular in the Muslim world, especially in South Asia, Southeast Asia and Central Asia.

Variations
The name has many variants in different part of the world, due to different Arabic romanization standards used. The variant Kausar and Kautsar mostly used in South Asia, Central Asia and Southeast Asia. While the variant Kawthar and Kaouthar generally used in Western Asia and North Africa. Due to French influence in the Maghreb region, the name is occasionally romanized as Kaouther or Kawther. The given name may refer to:

Kaouthar
Kaouthar Bachraoui, Tunisian newscaster

Kaouther
Kaouther Ben Hania (born 1977), Tunisian film director
Kaouther Adimi (born 1986), Algerian writer

Kausar
Kausar Abdullah Malik (born 1945), Pakistani scientist 
Kausar Bashir Ahmed (1939–2006), Pakistani architect
Kausar Chandpuri (1900–1990), Indian physician and writer
Kausar Munir (born 1977), Indian writer
Kausar Niazi (1934–1994), Pakistani politician
Kausar Yazdani (born 1935), Indian scholar and writer

Kawther
Kawther Ramzi (1931–2018), Egyptian actress

References

Arabic unisex given names
Indian unisex given names
Kazakh given names
Pakistani unisex given names